Julio Gilberto Quintana Calmet  (July 13, 1904 - June 16, 1981)
was a Peruvian football midfielder who played for Peru in the 1930 FIFA World Cup. He also played for Alianza Lima.

References

External links
FIFA profile

1904 births
1981 deaths
Peruvian footballers
Peru international footballers
Association football midfielders
Club Alianza Lima footballers
1930 FIFA World Cup players